Kąp  is a settlement, part of the village of Ruda in the administrative district of Gmina Miłki, within Giżycko County, Warmian-Masurian Voivodeship, in north-eastern Poland. It is located in the historic region of Masuria.

The settlement most likely was founded after 1945.

References

Villages in Giżycko County